Obuasi East District is one of the forty-three districts in Ashanti Region, Ghana. Originally it was formerly part of the then-larger Obuasi Municipal District on 17 February 2004; until part of the district was split off to create Obuasi East District on 15 March 2018; thus the remaining part has been retained as Obuasi Municipal District. The district assembly is the southern part of Ashanti Region and has Tutuka as its capital town.

References

Sources
 
 GhanaDistricts.com

Districts of Ashanti Region